Baldwin-Chandlee Supply Company-Valley Supply Company is a historic commercial building located at Elkins, Randolph County, West Virginia.  It is a two-story, twelve bay brick building in three sections.  The first section was built in 1905; the second, and center, section, was built in 1923; the third section was built about 1947.

It was listed on the National Register of Historic Places in 1998.

References

Commercial buildings on the National Register of Historic Places in West Virginia
Commercial buildings completed in 1905
Buildings and structures in Elkins, West Virginia
Buildings designated early commercial in the National Register of Historic Places in West Virginia
National Register of Historic Places in Randolph County, West Virginia
1905 establishments in West Virginia